Henry John Burt (6 May 1875 – 20 September 1960) was a British sport shooter who competed in the 1912 Summer Olympics.

He won the bronze medal in the 50 metre rifle, prone event. He also competed in the 25 metre small-bore rifle event and finished ninth.

References

External links
 

1875 births
1960 deaths
British male sport shooters
Shooters at the 1912 Summer Olympics
Olympic shooters of Great Britain
Olympic bronze medallists for Great Britain
Olympic medalists in shooting
Medalists at the 1912 Summer Olympics
20th-century British people